This article presents a list of towns and villages in New France. These towns and villages were / are still located throughout the former North American colonies of France.

Acadia 
Beaubassin
Cobequid
Pisiguit
Port-Royal
Grand-Pré

Canada 
Beauport
Charlesbourg
Kamouraska
L'Assomption
Montmagny
Montreal
Québec
Tadoussac
Trois-Rivières
Varennes
Verchères

Upper Country 
Détroit
La Baye
Sainte-Marie among the Hurons
Saint-Ignace
Sault-Sainte-Marie

Louisiana 
Baton Rouge 
Biloxi
Cahokia
Kaskaskia
La Vieille Mine
Mine à Breton
Mobile
Natchitoches
New Orleans
Prairie du Rocher
Saint Philippe
St. Louis
Ste-Geneviève
Vincennes

Royal Island 
Arichat
Baie de Glace
Louisbourg
Petit-de-Grat

Isle Saint John 
Port-LaJoye

French Coast of Newfoundland 
Miquelon
Plaisance
Saint-Pierre

France geography-related lists
New France
New France
United States history-related lists